The Change We Choose: Speeches 2007–2009 is a book of speeches by Gordon Brown.

It was published by Mainstream Publishing on 1 April 2010, about a month before Brown resigned as Prime Minister of the United Kingdom.

In August 2010, the conservative Daily Telegraph newspaper reported that the book had been a commercial failure, selling only thirty-two copies. According to the Handelsblatt, the book was already sold heavily discounted at that time.

References

2010 non-fiction books
Books about politics of the United Kingdom
Books about the United Kingdom
Political books
Books by Gordon Brown
Books written by prime ministers of the United Kingdom
Mainstream Publishing books